The 1966–67 NCAA University Division men's basketball season began in December 1966, progressed through the regular season and conference tournaments, and concluded with the 1967 NCAA University Division basketball tournament championship game on March 25, 1967, at Freedom Hall in Louisville, Kentucky. The UCLA Bruins won their third NCAA national championship with a 79–64 victory over the Dayton Flyers.

Season headlines 

 The NCAA tournament expanded from 22 to 23 teams.
 UCLA went undefeated (30–0) and won its first of an eventual seven NCAA championships in a row, third overall, and third in four seasons. In the Athletic Association of Western Universities, it also won its first of what ultimately would be 13 consecutive conference titles.

Season outlook

Pre-season polls 

The Top 10 from the AP Poll and Top 20 from the Coaches Poll during the pre-season.

Conference membership changes

Regular season

Conference winners and tournaments

Informal championships

Statistical leaders

Post-season tournaments

NCAA tournament

Final Four 

 Third Place – Houston 84, North Carolina 62

National Invitation tournament

Semifinals & finals 

 Third Place – Rutgers 93, Marshall 76

Awards

Consensus All-American teams

Major player of the year awards 

 Helms Player of the Year: Lew Alcindor, UCLA
 Associated Press Player of the Year: Lew Alcindor, UCLA
 UPI Player of the Year: Lew Alcindor, UCLA
 Oscar Robertson Trophy (USBWA): Lew Alcindor, UCLA
 Sporting News Player of the Year: Lew Alcindor, UCLA

Major coach of the year awards 

 Associated Press Coach of the Year: John Wooden, UCLA
 Henry Iba Award (USBWA): John Wooden, UCLA
 NABC Coach of the Year: John Wooden, UCLA
 UPI Coach of the Year: John Wooden, UCLA
 Sporting News Coach of the Year: Jack Hartman, Southern Illinois

Other major awards 

 Robert V. Geasey Trophy (Top player in Philadelphia Big 5): Cliff Anderson, St. Joseph's
 NIT/Haggerty Award (Top player in New York City metro area): Sonny Dove, St. John's

Coaching changes 

A number of teams changed coaches during the season and after it ended.

References